The 2014–15 Florida Atlantic Owls men's basketball team represented Florida Atlantic University during the 2014–15 NCAA Division I men's basketball season. The Owls, led by first year head coach Michael Curry, played their home games at the FAU Arena, and were members of Conference USA. They finished the season 9–20, 2–16 in C-USA play to finish in last place. They failed to qualify for the C-USA tournament.

Previous season 
The Owls the season 10–22, 5–11 in C-USA play to finish in a tie for twelfth place. They lost in the first round of the C-USA tournament to Marshall.

Departures

Incoming transfers

Recruiting class of 2014

Recruiting class of 2015

Roster

Schedule

|-
!colspan=9 style="background:#003366; color:#CE2029;"| Exhibition

|-
!colspan=9 style="background:#003366; color:#CE2029;"| Regular season

References

Florida Atlantic Owls men's basketball seasons
Florida Atlantic
Florida Atlantic Owls men's b
Florida Atlantic Owls men's b